Hilda Flavia Nakabuye (born 15 April 1997) is a Ugandan climate and environmental rights activist who founded Uganda's Fridays for Future movement. She also advocates for greater gender equality and racial diversity in the climate change movement. One of her environmental concerns is saving Lake Victoria, which connects Uganda to neighbouring countries. As part of her activism, Nakabuye visits schools and communities to empower more women to join the fight against climate change, stating that "the climate crisis has no borders". She also created Climate Striker Diaries, an online platform to encourage digital awareness about climate change. 

Nakabuye has been protesting in Kampala, Uganda, since 2017 after gate-crashing a climate dialogue by the Green Climate Campaign Africa (GCCA) at Kampala University. It was this event that made her realise that climate change was the cause of the severe weather that had destroyed her grandmother's farm. She began volunteering with the GCCA as a green campaigner, but soon felt the need for a stronger movement to evoke effective change.

Early life and background 
She studied from Kampala International University and attained a bachelor’s degree in procurement and supply change management.

Activism 
As part of Uganda's Fridays for Future movement, Nakabuye and her fellow climate activists have been dedicated to mobilising a strong youth movement to demand urgent action towards the climate crisis. The Fridays for Future movement in Uganda is now East Africa's largest youth movement, with over 50,000 young people spread across 52 schools and five universities, as well as members of the general public across Uganda, Sierra Leone, Angola, Gabon, Nigeria and Kenya.

Nakabuye has spoken out about the lack of diversity in the climate change movement, stating that, "the debate on climate change is not for whites only." She criticised the media after Vanessa Nakate, another Ugandan climate activist was cropped out of a photo taken at the World Economic Forum in Davos in January 2020. She denounced this act as a form of "environmental racism and discrimination," as Nakate's absence meant that the image showed only white activists, including 17-year-old Greta Thunberg. 

Nakabuye's climate activism has received international attention, having been featured as one of the prominent young women striking for climate change in various news outlets, including BBC News, Vox, and Time. On 11 October 2019, she was invited to give a speech at the C40 Mayors summit in Copenhagen, Denmark, to demand urgent action from the leaders of the world's largest cities.

References 

Ugandan activists
1997 births
Living people